Sarv Nokhvodi (also Romanized as Sarv Nokhvodī; also known as Sarv va Nokhvodī) is a village in Sarvestan Rural District, in the Central District of Sarvestan County, Fars Province, Iran. At the 2006 census, its population was 52, in 9 families.

References 

Populated places in Sarvestan County